Emile Meyer (August 18, 1910 – March 19, 1987) was an American actor, usually known for tough, aggressive, authoritative characters in Hollywood films from the 1950s era, mostly in westerns or thrillers.

Career
Meyer had an uncredited small speaking role as a sea captain in Panic in the Streets (1950) after Elia Kazan discovered him in a theatrical production in New Orleans. Meyer provided such noteworthy performances as Rufus Ryker the cattle baron who brings in a hired killer in Shane (1953), as the belligerent Mr Halloran in Blackboard Jungle (1955), cast against type by Stanley Kubrick as Father Dupree in Paths of Glory (1957) and the corrupt cop Harry Kello who intends to 'chastise' Tony Curtis in Sweet Smell of Success (1957), his most frequently remembered role today. He appeared in an episode of the 1961 series The Asphalt Jungle.

He also appeared on television, including a guest spot on John Payne's The Restless Gun and as a truculently stubborn juror opposite James Garner in the 1957 Maverick episode "Rope of Cards," among several other supporting appearances in various roles during the course of the series.  His guest appearance on the Restless Gun episode "Man and Boy" in 1957 included filming on the Iverson Movie Ranch in Chatsworth, Calif.

His final film role was in The Legend of Frank Woods (1977).

Death
On March 19, 1987, Meyer died at North Shore Regional Medical Center in Slidell, Louisiana. He was 76 and had suffered from Alzheimer's disease.

Partial filmography 

 Panic in the Streets (1950) - Capt. Beauclyde - Master of Nile Queen (uncredited)
 Tomorrow Is Another Day (1951) - Welder (uncredited)
 The Guy Who Came Back (1951) - Police Guard (uncredited)
 The People Against O'Hara (1951) - Capt. Tom Mulvaney
 The Mob (1951) - Gas Station Attendant (uncredited)
 The Sea Hornet (1951) - Harrie (uncredited)
 Cattle Queen (1951) - Shotgun Thompson
 The Big Night (1951) - Peckinpaugh
 The Wild North (1952) - Jake (uncredited)
 Boots Malone (1952) - Racetrack Security Guard (uncredited)
 Shadow in the Sky (1952) - Bartender (uncredited)
 Carbine Williams (1952) - Head Guard (uncredited)
 Glory Alley (1952) - General (uncredited)
 We're Not Married! (1952) - Beauty Contest Announcer (uncredited)
 Hurricane Smith (1952) - Capt. Raikes
 Bloodhounds of Broadway (1952) - Skipper (uncredited)
 Girls in the Night (1953) - Police Officer Kovacs
 Shane (1953) - Rufus Ryker
 Sangaree (1953) - Angry Townsman (uncredited)
 The Farmer Takes a Wife (1953) - Storekeeper (uncredited)
 Riot in Cell Block 11 (1954) - Warden Reynolds
 Drums Across the River (1954) - Nathan Marlowe
 Silver Lode (1954) - Sheriff Wooley
 Shield for Murder (1954) - Capt. Gunnarson
 The Human Jungle (1954) - Police Chief Abe Rowan
 White Feather (1955) - Magruder
 Blackboard Jungle (1955) - Mr. Halloran
 Stranger on Horseback (1955) - Sheriff Nat Bell
 The Tall Men (1955) - Chickasaw Charlie
 The Girl in the Red Velvet Swing (1955) - Hunchbacher
 Man with the Gun (1955) - Saul Atkins
 The Man with the Golden Arm (1955) - Detective Bednar
 Raw Edge (1956) - Pop Penny
 The Maverick Queen (1956) - Leo Malone
 Gun the Man Down (1956) - Sheriff Morton
 Badlands of Montana (1957) - Henry Harrison Hammer
 Sweet Smell of Success (1957) - Lt. Harry Kello
 The Delicate Delinquent (1957) - Sgt. Kelly (uncredited)
 Paths of Glory (1957) - Father Duprée
 Baby Face Nelson (1957) - Mac - Detective
 The Lineup (1958) - Insp. Al Quine
 The Case Against Brooklyn (1958) - Police Capt. T.W. Wills
 The Fiend Who Walked the West (1958) - Ames
 Revolt in the Big House (1958) - Warden
 Good Day for a Hanging (1959) - Marshal Hiram Cain
 King of the Wild Stallions (1959) - Matt Macguire
 The Threat (1960) - Duncan
 The Girl in Lovers Lane (1960) - Cal Anders
 Young Jesse James (1960) - Maj. Charlie Quantrill
 The George Raft Story (1961) - Detective Captain (uncredited)
 Move Over, Darling (1963) - Process Server (uncredited)
 Taggart (1964) - Ben Blazer
 Young Dillinger (1965) - Det. Jergins
 Hostile Guns (1967) - Uncle Joe Reno
 A Time for Killing (1967) - Col. Harries
 The Hardy Boys: The Mystery of the Chinese Junk (1967) - Burke
 Buckskin (1968) - Corbin
 More Dead Than Alive (1969) - Bartender
 A Time for Dying (1969) - (uncredited)
 The Outfit (1973) - Amos Hopper
 Macon County Line (1974) - Gurney
 The Legend of Frank Woods (1977) - Sheriff Dooley (final film role)

References

External links

American male film actors
1910 births
1987 deaths
Male actors from New Orleans
20th-century American male actors
American male television actors